The New Zealand Institute of Economic Research (NZIER) is the largest independent think tank in New Zealand. It is non-profit incorporated society and was established in 1958. It seeks to take a centrist, politically neutral position.

It has a staff of more than 30 people and is probably the largest economic research unit in New Zealand outside of government. Most of its work is commercial microeconomic consultancy for businesses. It also does public good work.

Past directors include Alan Bollard and Brian Easton, and a past chair was Ron Trotter.

The Institute owns a MONIAC computer that is currently on loan to the Reserve Bank of New Zealand museum.

References

External links
New Zealand Institute of Economic Research
 The evolving Institute: 50 years of the NZ Institute of Economic Research, 1958-2008

Think tanks based in New Zealand
Economy of New Zealand
Economic research institutes
Royal Society of New Zealand